Splinters in the Navy is a 1931 British comedy film directed by Walter Forde and starring Sydney Howard, Alf Goddard, and Helena Pickard. The film was made at Twickenham Studios, and is a sequel to the film Splinters (1929), about an army concert party. A further sequel, Splinters in the Air, was released in 1937.

Premise
To celebrate their Admiral's impending marriage, his men stage a variety performance. Meanwhile Joe Crabbs attempts to win back his girlfriend from the Navy's boxing champion.

Cast
 Sydney Howard as Joe Crabbs 
 Alf Goddard as Spike Higgins 
 Helena Pickard as Lottie 
 Frederick Bentley as Bill Miffins 
 Paddy Browne as Mabel 
 Rupert Lister as Admiral 
 Harold Heath as Master-at-Arms 
 Ian Wilson as Call Boy 
 Lew Lake as himself 
 Hal Jones as himself 
 Reg Stone as himself 
 Wilfred Temple as himself 
 Laurie Lawrence as Petty Officer 
 Thomas Thurban as Bandmaster

References

Bibliography
 Low, Rachael. Filmmaking in 1930s Britain. George Allen & Unwin, 1985.
 Sutton, David R. A Chorus of Raspberries: British Film Comedy 1929-1939. University of Exeter Press, 2000.
 Wood, Linda. British Films, 1927-1939. British Film Institute, 1986.

External links

1931 films
British comedy films
British black-and-white films
1931 comedy films
Films directed by Walter Forde
Films shot at Twickenham Film Studios
Films set in England
Seafaring films
1930s English-language films
1930s British films